Predator 2 is a 1990 rail shooter video game developed by Oxford Mobius and Arc Developments and published by Image Works, Konami and Mirrorsoft for MS-DOS, Amiga, Amstrad CPC, Atari ST, Commodore 64,and the ZX Spectrum. It is based on the film of the same title.

Gameplay

The Gameplay bears a lot of similarities to other first person shooters, particularly Operation Wolf and Dynamite Duke

Plot
The plot of the game follows the plot of the movie in which the player assumes the role of Lieutenant Mike Harrigan as he fights the Jamaican Posse, Colombian Cartel, and the Predator himself.

Development
The Amiga, Atari ST, and DOS versions of Predator 2, as developed by Arc Developments and published by Image Works, began development in July 1990, and were released in the Spring of 1991. In a December 1990 issue of British gaming magazine The One, The One interviewed team members from Arc Developments for information regarding Predator 2's development in a pre-release interview. The majority of the game's development was to be completed in five months. Image Works initially requested that Predator 2 have five levels, but Arc Developments negotiated with Image Works, with the final compromise being that the game has four levels, but level one is double the length of the other levels. Input from 20th Century Fox, the copyright holder of Predator, led to content restrictions upon Predator 2; Paul Walker, Predator 2's designer and graphic artist, stated that they have to "approve all graphics", and further expressed that Fox disallowed death and blood, which Walker described as "impossible" due to the content of the film. Walker stated that these restrictions were due to Fox marketing the game to a younger audience, and said that "The film's all blood everywhere, but they say 'It's a kiddies game, we don't want killing in there'." These limitations were a complication in Predator 2's development, but the team came to a solution wherein characters "fall over backwards and disappear" when defeated, as opposed to dying. Another complication was that the likenesses of actors in the film had to be approved by their agents. To keep interference at a minimum, Arc Developments kept a list of actors who 'didn't care' about their likeness in the game, as well as a list of those who did; Danny Glover, the actor who played Harrigan, had to approve his likeness in Predator 2 whenever new sprites were made.

Predator 2's graphics were made on a Compaq 386 Despro PC running Windows 3.0, and the DOS version of Deluxe Paint II Enhanced. Predator 2's graphics were designed on PC as opposed to an Amiga due to greater flexibility and being faster overall; the game was also programmed on PC, and this consistency allowed the team to transfer data between computers through serial or floppy disks. Walker expressed that Windows 3's ability to multitask was useful, allowing him to work on the graphics of different versions of the game simultaneously in different windows of DPaint.

Reception

Computer Gaming World praised the Amiga version's graphics but called the Commodore 64 version "extremely disappointing", and criticized the lack of a save game option as "extremely frustrating". In Germany, Predator was put on the 'German index' by the Federal Department for Media Harmful to Young Persons, which made it illegal to sell or make the game available to minors in Germany, as well as making it illegal to advertise the game in any form.

References

External links
 
 Predator 2 at Amiga Hall of Light
 Predator 2 at Lemon
 Predator 2 at Lemon Amiga
 Predator 2 at World of Spectrum

1990 video games
Amiga games
Amstrad CPC games
Atari ST games
Commodore 64 games
DOS games
Konami games
Predator (franchise) games
Rail shooters
Side-scrolling video games
Single-player video games
Video games about police officers
Video games developed in the United Kingdom
Video games featuring black protagonists
Video games set in 1997
Video games set in Los Angeles
ZX Spectrum games
Mirrorsoft games
Image Works games
Arc Developments games